Studnice is a municipality and village in Vyškov District in the South Moravian Region of the Czech Republic. It has about 500 inhabitants.

Administrative parts
The village of Odrůvky is an administrative part of Studnice.

References

Villages in Vyškov District